Ercsi is a town in central Hungary, located around 35 km south of Budapest in county Fejér.

External links

  in Hungarian
Introduction of Ercsi

Populated places in Fejér County